Hyport Duqm is an Omani-Belgian initiative.

References 

Hydrogen production
Ammonia
Al Wusta Governorate (Oman)
Buildings and structures in Oman
Energy infrastructure in Oman
Proposed energy projects